The 2018 FFA Cup preliminary rounds was the qualifying competition to decide 21 of the 32 teams which took part in the 2018 FFA Cup Round of 32, along with the 10 A-League clubs and reigning National Premier Leagues champion, Heidelberg United. The preliminary rounds operated within a consistent national structure whereby club entry into the competition was staggered in each federation, with the winning clubs from Round 7 of the preliminary rounds in each member federation gaining entry into the Round of 32. All Australian clubs were eligible to enter the qualifying process through their respective FFA member federation, however only one team per club is permitted entry in the competition.

Schedule
The number of fixtures for each round, and the match dates for each Federation, were as follows.

 Some round dates in respective Federations overlap due to separate scheduling of Zones/Sub-Zones.

Format
The preliminary rounds structures were as follows, and refer to the different levels in the unofficial Australian association football league system :

Qualifying round:
9 Queensland clubs level 4 and below entered this stage.
66 Victorian clubs level 7 and below entered this stage.
First round:
19 Northern NSW clubs  level 4 and below entered this stage.
16 Queensland clubs (7 from the previous round and 9 level 4–5) entered this stage.
95 Victorian clubs (36 from the previous round and 59 level 6–7) entered this stage.
Second round:
120 New South Wales clubs level 6 and below entered this stage.
60 Northern NSW clubs (16 from the previous round and 34  level 4 and below) entered this stage.
83 Queensland clubs (9 from the previous round and 74 level 4 and below) entered this stage.
42 South Australian clubs level 3 and below entered this stage.
84 Victorian clubs (48 from the previous round and 36 level 5–6) entered this stage.
32 Western Australian clubs level 5 and below entered this stage. For matches where the scores were equal at full-time, they went straight to penalties.
Third round:
14 Australian Capital Territory clubs level 3 and below entered this stage.
114 New South Wales clubs (88 from the previous round and 26 level 4–5) entered this stage.
42 Northern NSW clubs (31 from the previous round and 11 level 3) entered this stage.
8 Northern Territory clubs level 2 and below entered this stage.
58 Queensland clubs (52 from the previous round and 6 level 4) entered this stage.
32 South Australian clubs (21 from the previous round and 11 level 2) entered this stage.
12 Tasmanian clubs level 3 entered this stage.
66 Victorian clubs (42 from the previous round and 24 level 4) entered this stage.
32 Western Australian clubs (16 from the previous round and 22 level 3–4) entered this stage.
Fourth round:
 16 Australian Capital Territory clubs (7 from the previous round and 9 level 2) entered this stage.
80 New South Wales clubs (57 from the previous round and 23 level 2–3) entered this stage.
31 Northern NSW clubs (21 from the previous round and 10 level 2) entered this stage.
5 Northern Territory clubs progressed to this stage.
50 Queensland clubs (31 from the previous round and 19 level 2–3) entered this stage.
16 South Australian clubs progressed to this stage.
16 Tasmanian clubs (6 from the previous round and 10 level 2–3) entered this stage.
64 Victorian clubs (33 from the previous round and 31 level 2–3) entered this stage.
32 Western Australian clubs (19 from the previous round and 13 level 2) entered this stage.
Fifth round:
8 Australian Capital Territory clubs progressed to this stage.
40 New South Wales clubs progressed to this stage.
16 Northern New South Wales clubs progressed to this stage.
7 Northern Territory clubs (3 from the previous round and 4 clubs from the Alice Springs zone) entered this stage.
32 Queensland clubs (25 from the previous round and 7 level 2) entered this stage.
8 South Australian clubs progressed to this stage.
8 Tasmanian clubs progressed to this stage.
32 Victorian clubs progressed to this stage.
16 Western Australian clubs progressed to this stage.
Sixth round:
4 Australian Capital Territory clubs progressed to this stage, and also got a home fixture when they entered the 2019 FFA Cup preliminary rounds.
20 New South Wales progressed to this stage.
8 Northern New South Wales clubs progressed to this stage.
4 Northern Territory clubs progressed to this stage.
16 Queensland clubs progressed to this stage.
4 South Australian clubs progressed to this stage.
4 Tasmanian clubs progressed to this stage.
16 Victorian clubs progressed to this stage.
8 Western Australian clubs progressed to this stage.
Seventh round:
2 Australian Capital Territory clubs progressed to this stage, which doubled as the Final of the Federation Cup.
10 New South Wales clubs progressed to this stage. The 5 winners also participated in the final rounds of the Waratah Cup.
4 Northern New South Wales clubs progressed to this stage.
2 Northern Territory clubs progressed to this stage – the winners of the Darwin-based and Alice Springs-based knockout competitions – which doubled as the final of the Sport Minister's Cup.
8 Queensland clubs progressed to this stage.
2 South Australian clubs progressed to this stage, which doubled as the Grand Final of the Federation Cup.
2 Tasmanian clubs progressed to this stage, which doubled as the Grand Final of the Milan Lakoseljac Cup.
8 Victorian clubs progressed to this stage. The 4 winners, plus Heidelberg United, also qualified to the final rounds of the Dockerty Cup.
4 Western Australian clubs progressed to this stage. The 2 winners also played in the Final of the Football West State Cup.

Note: Heidelberg United did not participate in the Victorian qualifying rounds, as they already qualified into the FFA Cup as 2017 National Premier Leagues champions.

Note: A-League Youth teams playing in their respective federation leagues are specifically excluded from the preliminary rounds as their respective Senior A-League clubs are already part of the competition.

Key to Abbreviations

Qualifying round

Notes
 w/o = Walkover
 † = After Extra Time
 QLD Byes – Bribie Island Tigers (5), Gympie United (4), Kawana Force (4), Maroochydore Swans (4) and Woombye Snakes (4).
 VIC Byes – Albert Park (8), Ballarat North United (10), Lyndale United (8), Moonee Valley Knights (8), Mt Lilydale Old Collegians (8) and Uni Hill Eagles (8).

First round

Notes
 w/o = Walkover
 † = After Extra Time
 NNSW Byes – Boambee Bombers (4), Coffs City United (4), Kempsey Saints (4), Macleay Valley Rangers (4), Orara Valley (4), Port Saints (4), Port United (-), Sawtell Scorpions (4), Taree Wildcats (4), Urunga FC (4), Wallamba FC (-), Wauchope Axemen (4) and Westlawn Tigers (4).
 QLD Byes – Buderim Wanderers (4) and Stratford Dolphins (4).
 VIC Bye – Mount Waverley City (8).

Second round

Notes
 w/o = Walkover
 † = After Extra Time
 NSW Byes – Albion Park White Eagles (6), Banksia Tigers (-), Bankstown RSL Dragons (8), Bass Hill (-), Bega Devils (-), Belrose-Terrey Hills Raiders (-), Berkeley Vale (-), Bomaderry SC (-), Bringelly FC (-), Brookvale Football Club (-), Budgewoi FC (-), Callala Brumbies (-), Central Coast United (-), Coniston FC (-), Connells Point Rovers FC (-), Cranebrook United (-), Dee Why FC (-), Emu Plains FC (-), Epping Eastwood (6), Forest Rangers (-), Gerringong Breakers (6), Gladesville Ravens (6), Glenhaven FC (-), Granville Kewpie Ariana (-), Greenacre Eagles (-), Hazelbrook FC (-), Helensburgh Thistle Soccer Club (-), Henwood Park FC (-), Hills Hawks FC (-), Holroyd Rangers SC (-), Kellyville Kolts (-), Kenthurst and District (-), Killarney District (6), Kogarah Waratah FC (-), Lake Albert (6), Lane Cove (-), Leichhardt Saints (SPL) (6), Lilli Pilli (6), Lindfield FC (-), Lugarno FC (-), Marayong FC (6), Maroubra United (6), Minchinbury Jets (-), Narellan Rangers SC (-), Padstow United (6), Pagewood Botany (-), Peakhurst United (-), Pendle Hill (-), Quakers Hill JSC (6), Ryde Saints United FC (-), Sans Souci FC (-), South Coast Flame FC (-), Tarrawanna Blueys SC (-), Terrigal United (6), Tolland FC (-), West Pennant Hills Cherrybrook (6), West Pennant Hills Redbacks (-) and Woy Woy FC (-).
 NNSW Byes – Mayfield United Junior (4) and Oxley Vale Attunga (4).
 QLD Byes – Albany Creek (4), Bayside United (4), Broadbeach United (4), Brothers Aston Villa (4), Burdekin FC (4), Centenary Stormers (4), Doon Villa (4), Gold Coast Knights (4), Grange Thistle (4), Mackay Magpies (4), Mackay Wanderers (4), Mount Gravatt Hawks (4), Murwillumbah SC (4), North Pine (4), Saints Eagles South (4), Southside Comets (4), The Gap (4), Tinana (5), University of Queensland (4), Virginia United (4) and West Wanderers (4).

Third round

Notes
 w/o = Walkover
 † = After Extra Time
 NT Byes – Darwin Olympic (2), Hellenic AC (2)
 QLD Byes – Capricorn Coast (4), Mackay Lions (4), Marlin Coast Rangers (4) and Southside United (4).

Fourth round

Notes:
 † = After Extra Time
 NNSW Bye – Weston Workers Bears (2).
 NT Bye – University Azzurri (2).

Fifth round

Notes:
 † = After Extra Time
 NT Bye – Palmerston Rovers (2).

Sixth round

Notes:
 w/o = Walkover
 † = After Extra Time

Seventh round

Notes:
 † = After Extra Time

References

External links
 Official website

FFA Cup preliminary
FFA Cup preliminary
Australia Cup preliminary rounds